Allurigedda is a village in Y. Ramavaram Mandal, East Godavari in the state of Andhra Pradesh in India.

Demographics 
 India census, This Village had a population of 96, out of which 40 were male and 56 were female. Population of children below 6 years of age were 14%. The literacy rate of the village is 43%.

References 

Villages in Y. Ramavaram mandal